Salyer Ledge is a bold, flat-topped ridge (1300 m) at the western end of The Fortress, the series of ridges and cirques that comprise the western half of the Cruzen Range of the McMurdo Dry Valleys, Victoria Land. Named by the Advisory Committee on Antarctic Names in  2005 after Lieutenant Commander Herbert Salyer, U.S. Navy, co-pilot and navigator (Commander William Hawkes, R4D command pilot), on the Operation Highjump photographic flight of February 20, 1947, during which this ledge and Cruzen Range were observed for the first time and recorded.

References

Mountains of Victoria Land